Chrząszcz (beetle, chafer) by Jan Brzechwa is a poem famous for being considered one of the hardest-to-pronounce texts in Polish literature. It may cause problems even for adult, native Polish speakers.

The first few lines of the poem:

The first line "W Szczebrzeszynie chrząszcz brzmi w trzcinie"
(In Szczebrzeszyn a beetle buzzes in the reed) is a well-known Polish tongue-twister.

Thanks to the poem, the town of Szczebrzeszyn is widely known in Poland. A monument to the beetle was erected there in 2002, and a yearly sculpture festival has been held there ever since.

Chrząszcz was translated into English by Walter Whipple as Cricket (whose Polish equivalent, świerszcz, is also considered difficult to pronounce for non-Polish speakers).

See also
 Polish literature

References

Polish poems
Tongue-twisters